Delta III was an expendable launch vehicle made by Boeing. The first Delta III launch was on August 26, 1998. Of its three flights, the first two were failures, and the third, though declared successful, reached the low end of its targeted orbit range and carried only a dummy (inert) payload. The Delta III could deliver up to 8,400 pounds (3,800 kilograms) to geostationary transfer orbit, twice the payload of its predecessor, the Delta II. Under the four-digit designation system from earlier Delta rockets, the Delta III is classified as the Delta 8930.

Launch outcome statistics

Launch History

References 

Lists of Delta launches
Lists of rocket launches